Léonard (Collet) de Hodémont (1575–1639), was a Belgian Baroque composer, conductor, and organist.

Life
Hodémont is thought to have been born in Hodémont or Liège, and received his musical education at Saint Lambert's Cathedral in Liege. From 1595 he studied at the University of Leuven. On 15 October 1610 he was appointed as succentor at the collegiate church of Saint Pierre in Liège. In 1612 he became the canon at Saint Lambert's Cathedral and at the Church of St. Maternus in 1616. On 26 October 1619 he became choirmaster (maître de chant) at Saint Lambert's Cathedral. He held this position until 25 February 1633. He died in Liège.

Works
As a composer he wrote mainly sacred works. His compositions were widely influenced by Italian styles. Hodémont's work influenced music at the beginning of the 17th century in Liège. His pupils included Lambert Pietkin and Henry Du Mont de Thier, who became maître de chapelle for Louis XIV.

Sacred works
Salve Regina. Grand Livre de Chœur de Saint lambert
3 Ecce panis angelorum, from the 2nd choir book of Saint Lambert's Cathedral. (Liège)
14 Librorum antiphonarum de Sancti lamberti, (Liège, 1629)
Sacri concertus, motets. (Liège, 1630)
Various sacred compositions, whose manuscripts are preserved in Borgloon and the Conservatory of Liège.

Other works
Armonica recreatione, a collection of villanellas for 3 voices and basso continuo. (Antwerp, 1625-1640)

Notes

References
Thierry Levaux: Dictionnaire des compositeurs de Belgique du moyen âge à nos jours, Ohain-Lasne: Éditions Art in Belgium sprl, 2006. 736 p., 
Robert Eitner: Biographisch-Biblographisches Quellen-Lexikon der Musiker und Musikgelehrten der christlichen Zeitrechnung bis zur Mitte des neunzehnten Jahrhunderts, Leipzig, Breitkopf und Haertel, 1901. 5. Band (Hainglaise—Kytsch.)

Belgian Baroque composers
Belgian classical composers
Belgian male classical composers
1575 births
1639 deaths
17th-century classical composers
17th-century male musicians